The Girl and the Boy is a 1931 comedy film directed by Roger Le Bon and Wilhelm Thiele and starring Lilian Harvey, Henri Garat, and Lucien Baroux. It was made by the major studio UFA as the French-language version of Two Hearts Beat as One, which also starred Harvey. Such multiple-language versions were common in the early years of sound before dubbing became more widespread.

Cast
 Lilian Harvey as Jenny Berger / Ria bella
 Henri Garat as Victor Berger
 Lucien Baroux as Le duc d'Auribeau
 Mady Berry as Mme Bientôt
 Léonce Corne as Un avocat
 Tibor Halmay
 Franz Roth
 Marcel Vallée as Maurice Bientôt

References

Bibliography

External links 
 

1931 films
Films of the Weimar Republic
German comedy films
1931 comedy films
1930s French-language films
Films directed by Wilhelm Thiele
German films based on plays
Films set in France
Films set in hotels
Films about singers
Films about divorce
UFA GmbH films
German multilingual films
German black-and-white films
Films with screenplays by Franz Schulz
1931 multilingual films
1930s German films
French-language German films